John Kenneth George Melford Smith (5 September 1899 – 22 October 1972) was a British stage, film and television actor.

Biography
Melford was the younger brother of screenwriter and film director Austin Melford. On stage from the age of 12, Melford made his film debut in 1931. As well as appearing in various films and television shows, he also played Menelaus in the Doctor Who story The Myth Makers.

His daughter Jill Melford was an actress.

Selected filmography

 The Sport of Kings (1931) - Sir Reginald Toothill
 Night of the Garter (1933) - Kenneth Warwick
 Department Store (1935) - Bob Burge Goodman
 Look Up and Laugh (1935) - Journalist
 Honeymoon for Three (1935) - Raymond Dirk
 Birds of a Feather (1936) - Rudolph
 Find the Lady (1936) - Schemer Doyle
 If I Were Rich (1936) - Albert Mott
 Luck of the Turf (1936) - Sid Smith
 Radio Lover (1936) - Reggie Clifford
 Jump for Glory (1937) - Thompson
 Let's Make a Night of It (1937) - Count Castelli
 Command Performance (1937) - The Journalist
 Coming of Age (1938) - Roger Squire
 Scruffy (1938) - Jim
 Hold My Hand (1938) - Pop Currie
 It's in the Air (1938) - Lt. Terry - pilot
 Many Tanks Mr. Atkins (1938) - Capt. Torrent
 Too Many Husbands (1938) - Stephen Brinkway
 The Spider (1940) - Duke
 The Briggs Family (1940) - Jerry Tulse
 Spare a Copper (1940) - Dame (uncredited)
 Crook's Tour (1941) - Desert Bus Tour Guide (uncredited)
 They Met in the Dark (1943) - Defence Lawyer at Court Martial (uncredited)
 Theatre Royal (1943) - Himself
 The Rake's Progress (1945) - Race Team Member (uncredited)
 The Laughing Lady (1946) - Lord Barrymore
 The October Man (1947) - Wilcox
 When You Come Home (1948) - Dr. Dormer Franklyn
 My Brother Jonathan (1948) - Dr. Martock
 Counterblast (1948) - Detective (uncredited)
 No Room at the Inn (1948) - Councillor Wordsworth (uncredited)
 Warning to Wantons (1949) - Maurice Lugard
 Up for the Cup (1950) - Barrowboy
 Heights of Danger (1953) - Mr. Croudson
 Background (1953) - Mackay
 The Ladykillers (1955) - Detective (uncredited)
 The End of the Line (1957) - Inspector Gates
 Web of Suspicion (1959) - (uncredited)
 Night Train for Inverness (1960) - Boy's Father (uncredited)
 Bluebeard's Ten Honeymoons (1960) - Concierge (uncredited)
 Compelled (1960) - Grimes
 Transatlantic (1960) - Capt. Brady
 Sentenced for Life (1960) - (uncredited)
The Fourth Square (1961) - Stewart
 Feet of Clay (1961) - Soames
 Follow That Man (1961) - Lars Toren
 Hotel Incident (1962) - Max
 The Last Man Out (1962) - Sergeant-Major Knutley
 What Every Woman Wants (1962) - Dr. Falcon
 The Gentle Terror (1963) - Inspector Miles
 A Shot in the Dark (1964) - The Psycho-Analyst
 Night Train to Paris (1964) - PC inspector
 Walk a Tightrope (1964) - Bit Part
 A Home of Your Own (1965) 
 Lust for a Vampire (1971) - Bishop (final film role)

References

External links

1899 births
1972 deaths
English male stage actors
English male film actors
English male television actors
Male actors from London
20th-century English male actors